Jim Bludso is a 1917 American drama film directed by Tod Browning. It was Browning's first feature film as a director.

Contemporary sources are variable on the matter of whether the direction was a joint effort between Browning and the film's star, Wilfred Lucas. In their book Dark Carnival: The Secret World of Tod Browning, Hollywood's Master of the Macabre, David J. Skal and Elias Savada suggest that Lucas' name was added to the credit for contractual reasons, and that Browning directed Jim Bludso alone. As Jim Bludso is presumed lost, it is uncertain what the original title card might have read in terms of directorial credit. The film was produced by the Fine Arts unit within the Triangle Film Corporation, the same studio that made the popular Douglas Fairbanks comedies for Triangle, for whom Browning had previously worked as a scenarist.

Cast
 Wilfred Lucas as Jim Bludso
 Olga Grey as Gabrielle
 Georgie Stone as Little Breeches
 Charles Lee as Tom Taggart
 Winifred Westover as Kate Taggart
 Sam De Grasse as Ben Merrill
 James O'Shea as Banty Tim
 Monte Blue as Joe Bower
 Al Joy - Gambler
 Lillian Langdon
 Bert Woodruff

Plot
Engineer Jim Bludso and his sidekick, Banty Tim, return to Gilgal, Illinois after the end of the American Civil War. Upon arrival, they discover that Jim's wife, Gabrielle, has left him for another man and abandoned their son. Kate Taggart, the daughter of a storekeeper in town, takes pity on Jim and they develop a fondness for one another. Gabrielle, now dumped, returns and Jim forgives her and resumes their married life. Meanwhile, a flood is coming, and Ben Merrill—constructor of Gilgal's levee—knows the structure won't hold against the tide, so he willfully causes it to fail and plans to blame the resulting catastrophe on Jim and Banty Tim. Gabrielle is mortally wounded in the flood, and her dying words implicate Merrill and identify him as the man who wooed her away from her family. Jim is on board the boat Prairie Bell when this news reaches him, as is Merrill; they get into a fight, and Prairie Bell bursts into flames and explodes. Jim is rescued and returns to Gilgal to marry Kate.

Adaptation
Jim Bludso was a poem from the Pike County Ballads of John Hay, a familiar set piece in the repertoire of elocutionists, actors and other public speakers; the Kalem Company had already made a one-reeler out of the same property in 1912. For the film, Browning fashioned his script from both Jim Bludso and another poem, Little Breeches. Much of the film's dramatic arc also came from a 1903 stage play adaptation by I.N. Morris. Hay's original poem memorialized Jim Bludso's courage and selflessness in sacrificing his own life so that the passengers on his burning boat might survive. For the film, a happy ending was devised and an entirely different set of circumstances led to the demise of Prairie Bell, which Bludso is piloting in Hay's poem.

Reception
Film historian Bernd Herzogenrath reports that “By 1919, [two years] after profitable movies such as Jim Bludso (1917), Browning was an established and successful director and script writer.”

See also
List of lost films

Notes

Footnotes

References
Herzogenrath, Bernd. 2006. The Films of Tod Browning. Black Dog Publishing. London. 
Rosenthal, Stuart.  1975. Tod Browning: The Hollywood Professionals, Volume 4. The Tantivy Press.

External links
 
 

1917 films
Silent American drama films
American silent feature films
American black-and-white films
1917 drama films
Films directed by Tod Browning
Films directed by Wilfred Lucas
Lost American films
1917 lost films
Lost drama films
1910s American films